Lincoln Township is a civil township of Midland County in the U.S. state of Michigan. The population was 2,277 at the 2000 census.

Communities 
It began as a lumbering settlement, with a saloon named "Red Keg", which was popularized in novels by Eugene Thwing: The Man from Red Keg, and The Redkeggers. A post office named "Averill's Station" was established on September 30, 1868, and after the first postmaster, Averill S. Harrison. It was shortened to Averill on June 2, 1883. It was platted in 1870.

Geography

Demographics
As of the census of 2000, there were 2,277 people, 838 households, and 648 families residing in the township. The racial makeup of the township was 98.42% White, 0.22% African American, 0.53% Asian, 0.13% from other races, and 0.70% from two or more races. Hispanic or Latino of any race were 0.88% of the population.

There were 838 households, out of which 37.0% had children under the age of 18 living with them, 67.1% were married couples living together, 6.3% had a female householder with no husband present, and 22.6% were non-families. 17.3% of all households were made up of individuals, and 4.3% had someone living alone who was 65 years of age or older.  The average household size was 2.72 and the average family size was 3.07.

In the township the population was spread out, with 28.1% under the age of 18, 7.2% from 18 to 24, 31.5% from 25 to 44, 25.2% from 45 to 64, and 8.0% who were 65 years of age or older.  The median age was 36 years. For every 100 females, there were 102.6 males.  For every 100 females age 18 and over, there were 102.0 males.

The median income for a household in the township was $42,167, and the median income for a family was $47,448. Males had a median income of $40,913 versus $24,706 for females. The per capita income for the township was $19,168.  About 6.6% of families and 7.6% of the population were below the poverty line, including 9.8% of those under age 18 and 9.5% of those age 65 or over.

References

Townships in Midland County, Michigan
Townships in Michigan